The Choice and Partnership Approach (CAPA), is a model of engagement and clinical assessment, principally used in Child and Adolescent psychiatric services. It aims to use collaborative ways of working with service users to enhance the effectiveness of services and user satisfaction with services.

Origins
The model was developed over several years in two NHS trust providers, the Richmond and East Herts Child and Adolescent Mental Health Services.

The Model
CAPA focuses on the experience of the service user. It is a collaborative model where the clinicians providing the assessment act as facilitators for the user and their family. Once a referral is accepted by the service, the user is contacted to arrange a convenient time for an appointment. This is the Choice Appointment. The possible outcomes of this appointment are that the client;
 Decides they do not need further service
 They are referred to another provider
 They receive further appointments and work with a clinician in the service

The appointment tries to be collaborative and strengths based. Once a user is accepted, they enter the Partnership phase. The clinician continues to act as a facilitator with expertise rather than an expert with power. The work is composed of aspects that are Core work and parts that are Specialist work.

Principles underlying the model
The model is based on transparent collaboration, finding user strengths and developing a shared formulation. The original model refers to 11 key components, all of which should be implemented to work the best.

 Management leadership
 Language
 Handle demand
 Choice framework
 Full booking to Partnership
 Selecting Partnership clinician by skill
 Extended clinical skills in core work
 Job planning
 Goal setting and care planning
 Peer group supervision
 Team away days

The work is also guided by the 7 Helpful Habits.
 Handle Demand
 Extend Capacity
 Let Go of Families
 Process Map
 Flow management
 Use Care Bundles
 Look After Staff

References

External links 
 The CAMHS UK Network
 The Werry Center
 CAPA Model training

Psychiatric models
Child development